Rizzo the Rat is a Muppet character, created and originally performed by Steve Whitmire. He is a fictional rat who appeared on The Muppet Show and numerous films, with a starring role in the 1992 film The Muppet Christmas Carol.

The character is particularly associated with Gonzo the Great, with the two sharing a double act since 1992. Whitmire based the character on Ratso Rizzo in Midnight Cowboy and performed him until 2016.

Character
Rizzo is a streetwise and sarcastic rat with a New Jersey accent.  He is a self-proclaimed acrophobe. His humor can be risqué, as in the TV series The Muppets
he was given the line, "Is ABC going to be OK with 'Mother Teresa on a stick'?" To avoid potential difficulty with real-life censors, alternative lines were filmed.

Rizzo's family has been mentioned in Muppet media. He has 1,274 brothers and sisters, as told to Gonzo in The Muppet Christmas Carol. In 2016, Disney announced Rizzo came from a family that traditionally cooked pizzas. This addition to his story was in light of a new pizzeria at Disney's Hollywood Studios dedicated to Rizzo, called PizzeRizzo.

History

Rizzo's name is derived from Dustin Hoffman's Ratso Rizzo character in Midnight Cowboy.  Steve Whitmire created the character, based on rats he had previously made out of bottles.

Rizzo first appeared in episode 418 of The Muppet Show, as one of many rats following Christopher Reeve backstage. He can be seen mugging and reacting to practically every line of dialogue. He remained a scene-stealing background figure through the final season, occasionally performing with Dr. Teeth and The Electric Mayhem. By the time of The Muppet Christmas Carol, Whitmire had been performing Rizzo for around 12 years.

After the series, he appeared in The Great Muppet Caper as a bellboy in a fleabag London hotel. He has appeared in most later Muppet projects, including The Muppets Take Manhattan and Muppets Tonight. In The Muppet Christmas Carol, he developed a double act with Gonzo, with director Brian Henson and the crew envisioning Rizzo as "pain-in-the-neck sidekick." The characters narrate, break the fourth wall, and Rizzo challenges Gonzo's claims to be Charles Dickens. The Gonzo and Rizzo partnership was continued in Muppet Treasure Island, with Rizzo again offering a humorous critique of the handling of the story, and in Muppets from Space. Along with Kermit and Gonzo, Rizzo gave an audio commentary for the Muppets from Space DVD.

Rizzo appears as a background character in the 2011 film The Muppets, without a spoken dialogue, although he is seen singing along during the finale, as well as the scene in which Kermit the Frog addresses a large crowd of Muppets.  In Muppets Most Wanted (2014), and the short feature Rizzo's Biggest Fan on the Blu-ray release, the character calls for more screentime. Rizzo returned to prominence in the TV series The Muppets, where he was on a writing crew with Gonzo and Pepe the King Prawn.

In 2017, it was announced Whitmire departed from the Muppets franchise, including the part of Rizzo, after being dismissed from the part of Kermit the Frog in October 2016. Disney has not since announced a new performer for Rizzo, though Matt Vogel was cast as Kermit.

Appearances

 The Muppet Show (1980–1981) (TV)
 The Muppets Go to the Movies (1981)
 The Great Muppet Caper (1981)
 The Fantastic Miss Piggy Show (1982)
 Rocky Mountain Holiday (1983)
 The Muppets Take Manhattan (1984)
 The Muppets: A Celebration of 30 Years (1986, background character)
 A Muppet Family Christmas (1987)
 The Jim Henson Hour (1989, background character)
 The Muppets at Walt Disney World (1990)
 The Muppets Celebrate Jim Henson (1990)
 Muppet*Vision 3D (1991, pre-show only)
 The Muppet Christmas Carol (1992) – Appearance as himself
 Muppet Classic Theater (1994)
 Muppet Treasure Island (1996) – Appearance as himself
 Muppets Tonight (1996–1998) (TV)
 Muppets from Space (1999)
 Disneyland (2001)
 It's a Very Merry Muppet Christmas Movie (2002) (TV)
 The Muppets' Wizard of Oz (2005) (TV) – Appearance as himself and the Mayor of Munchkinland
 Studio DC: Almost Live (2008) (TV)
 A Muppets Christmas: Letters to Santa (2008) (TV)
 The Muppets (2011, background character)
 Lady Gaga and the Muppets Holiday Spectacular (2013) (TV)
 Muppets Most Wanted (2014)
 The Muppets (2015–2016) (TV)
 Muppet Babies (2018–2022) (TV)
 Muppets Haunted Mansion (2021, silent cameo) (Streaming)

References

External links 

Fictional characters who break the fourth wall
Fictional mice and rats
Television characters introduced in 1980
The Muppets characters

de:Die Muppet Show#Rizzo